Stade Frères Zioui is a multi-use stadium in Hussein Dey, Algeria.  It is currently used mostly for football matches and is the home ground of NA Hussein Dey.  The stadium holds 5,000 people.

External links
 Stadium file - goalzz.com

Zioui Brothers
Zioui Brothers